Estadio Islas Malvinas is a football stadium in Floresta, Buenos Aires, Argentina. It is the home ground for All Boys. The stadium holds 12,199 spectators and opened in 1963. 

The stadium's name reflects Argentina's claims of sovereignty over the Falkland Islands (Islas Malvinas in Spanish).

The stadium has been refurbished several times. The most important work was the construction of a second tier on the Mercedes street side.

In August 2001, a new stand was opened with an Argentina national U-20 team match. The new stand was built behind the goal on the Miranda street side.

In 2006 the stand made of wooden planks by Chivilcoy street was dismantled, and in September of that year they began construction of the new cement stand. The new stand, along with a new lighting system, were both inaugurated in February 2007. 

In 2008, the stadium had a major renovation that included the renovation of the press box, new luxury suites, and the restructuring of the entire second tier, which had been closed to the public for many years due to safety issues.

References

External links
Stadium information, official website
Stadium images and video

I
All Boys
1963 establishments in Argentina
Sports venues completed in 1963